B94 could be the moniker for:

• WBZZ HD2 in Pittsburgh, Pennsylvania
 B94, a postcode district in the B postcode area
 WKBI-FM in Saint Marys, Pennsylvania
 WBHV-FM in State College, Pennsylvania (as B94.5)
 KDKA-FM in Pittsburgh, Pennsylvania, which formerly branded as B94
 Sicilian Defence, Najdorf Variation, according to the Encyclopaedia of Chess Openings
 Burley Griffin Way, a road in NSW, Australia connecting Canberra with Griffith, designated as B94